The North American Open 2013 is the men's edition of the 2013 North American Open, which is a PSA World Series event Gold (prize money: 115 000 $). The event took place at the Westwood Club in Richmond, Virginia in the United States from 25 February to 2 March. Ramy Ashour won his second North American Open trophy, beating Nick Matthew in the final.

Prize money and ranking points
For 2013, the prize purse was $115,000. The prize money and points breakdown is as follows:

Seeds

Draw and results

See also
North American Open
PSA World Series 2013

References

External links
PSA North American Open 2013 website
North American Open 2013 official website

North American Open
North American Open
2013 in sports in Virginia
Squash in Virginia
North American Open